Daniel Reiss  (born August 24, 1982) is a German professional ice hockey defenceman who plays for the Hannover Scorpions in the Deutsche Eishockey Liga (DEL).

See also
Ice hockey in Germany

References

External links

Hannover Scorpions players
Living people
1982 births
German ice hockey defencemen
Sportspeople from Hanover